João Alberto de Souza (born 1 October 1935) is a Brazilian politician and businessman. He has represented Maranhão in the Federal Senate since 2011. Previously, he was a Deputy from Maranhão from 1999 to 2003. Alberto de Souza was governor of Maranhão from 1990 to 1991. He is a member of the Brazilian Democratic Movement Party, for which he was vice governor of Roseana.

References

Living people
1935 births
Members of the Federal Senate (Brazil)
Members of the Chamber of Deputies (Brazil) from Maranhão
Governors of Maranhão
Brazilian Democratic Movement politicians